Erythricium is a genus of fungi in the family Corticiaceae. Basidiocarps (fruit bodies) are effused, corticioid, and grow on wood or are lichenicolous. Erythricium salmonicolor is a widespread and commercially significant plant pathogen causing "pink disease" of Citrus and other trees.

References

External links

Corticiales
Agaricomycetes genera